Martindale is a residential neighbourhood in the northeast quadrant of Calgary, Alberta. It is bounded to the north by 80 Avenue NE, to the east by Falconridge Boulevard, to the south by 64 Avenue NE and to the west by Métis Trail. The Martindale LRT station opened in August 2012.

The area was annexed to the City of Calgary in 1961 and Martindale was established in 1983. It is represented in the Calgary City Council by the Ward 5 councillor.

Demographics

Residents in this community had a median household income of $65,185 in 2005, and there were 18.1% low income residents living in the neighbourhood. As of 2006, 39.4% of the residents were immigrants. A proportion of 3.0% of the buildings were condominiums or apartments, and 12.6% of the housing was used for renting.

Education
The community is served a number of schools, including Crossing Park School, Manmeet Singh Bhullar School, Nelson Mandela High School, École La Mosaïque (francophone K-6.

See also
List of neighbourhoods in Calgary

References

External links
Martindale Community Association

Neighbourhoods in Calgary